William Darren "Jock" Callander (born April 23, 1961) is a Canadian former professional ice hockey player, and current front office executive, part-time assistant coach, and TV analyst for the Cleveland Monsters of the American Hockey League.

Career
Callander, the younger brother of NHL player Drew, replaced a small NHL career with a historic one in the IHL. Never drafted, he had brief stops with the St. Louis Blues, Pittsburgh Penguins, and Tampa Bay Lightning, but with the Muskegon/Cleveland Lumberjacks he was sensational, registering 1,242 career points, only 10 points behind Len Thornson's IHL record.

Callander started slowly in junior with the Regina Pats, but in his last two seasons he produced staggering totals of 146 goals and 343 points, leading the league in 1981–82. Nonetheless, he was never drafted by an NHL team, signing with St. Louis as a free agent, though never playing for the Blues. Instead, he had to settle for a start in the CHL and IHL, where he spent the first five pro years of his career. He signed with Pittsburgh, and over the next three years split his time between the Penguins and the IHL.

The highlight of his NHL time came in 1991–92. After playing the whole year with Muskegon, he came up to the Penguins for the playoffs, appearing in a dozen games en route to the Stanley Cup. At the 1992 victory celebration for the Pittsburgh Penguins at Three Rivers Stadium, Callander lost his watch to a fan who had inadvertently grabbed it while slapping hands.  Over the summer, though, he became a free agent and Pittsburgh did not sign him; instead, he went to Tampa Bay. Callander played eight games with the Lightning and most of the next eight years back in the IHL with Cleveland.

Personal life

Callander retired from hockey following the 1999–2000 season and became an assistant coach for Cleveland in 2000–01 before joining the Houston Aeros the following year.

In 2007, Callander returned to Cleveland to work with the city's then-new American Hockey League franchise, the Lake Erie Monsters.  He is a color analyst for the team's TV broadcasts, serves as an assistant coach for games not televised, and works in the team's front office as Vice President of Hockey Affairs and Team Services.

On December 16, 2011, before a Monsters game at Quicken Loans Arena in Cleveland, Callander had his number 15 retired in honor of his career as a member of the Lumberjacks, as well as his involvement in hockey initiatives in the Cleveland area.

Career statistics

Awards and honors
Bob Brownridge Memorial Trophy (WHL leading scorer) - 1982
Two-time IHL All-Star Team Selection - 1987, 1992
Leo P. Lamoureux Memorial Trophy (Leading Scorer - IHL) (1987) (tied with Jeff Pyle)
James Gatschene Memorial Trophy (MVP - IHL) (1987) (co-winner - Jeff Pyle)
1992 Stanley Cup Championship (as a member of the Pittsburgh Penguins)
Two-time Turner Cup Champion (as a member of the Muskegon Lumberjacks) - 1986, 1989
2016 Calder Cup Champion (as an assistant coach/front office executive/announcer for the Lake Erie Monsters)
Number 15 retired by:
the Cleveland Monsters
the Muskegon/Cleveland Lumberjacks 
the Regina Pats

References

External links

1961 births
Atlanta Knights players
Canadian ice hockey centres
Cleveland Lumberjacks players
Living people
Montana Magic players
Muskegon Lumberjacks players
Muskegon Mohawks players
Sportspeople from Regina, Saskatchewan
Pittsburgh Penguins players
Regina Blues players
Regina Pats players
Salt Lake Golden Eagles (CHL) players
Stanley Cup champions
Tampa Bay Lightning players
Toledo Goaldiggers players
Undrafted National Hockey League players
Canadian expatriate ice hockey players in the United States